The 1997–98 Cypriot Third Division was the 27th season of the Cypriot third-level football league. AEZ Zakakiou won their 2nd title.

Format
Fourteen teams participated in the 1997–98 Cypriot Third Division. All teams played against each other twice, once at their home and once away. The team with the most points at the end of the season crowned champions. The first three teams were promoted to the 1998–99 Cypriot Second Division and the last three teams were relegated to the 1998–99 Cypriot Fourth Division.

Point system
Teams received three points for a win, one point for a draw and zero points for a loss.

Changes from previous season
Teams promoted to 1997–98 Cypriot Second Division
 Rotsidis Mammari
 Iraklis Gerolakkou
 ASIL Lysi

Teams relegated from 1996–97 Cypriot Second Division
 Achyronas Liopetriou
 AEZ Zakakiou
 AEK Kakopetrias

Teams promoted from 1996–97 Cypriot Fourth Division
 Adonis Idaliou
 Achilleas Ayiou Theraponta
 Enosis Kokkinotrimithia

Teams relegated to 1997–98 Cypriot Fourth Division
 Orfeas Nicosia
 AEK Katholiki
 Tsaggaris Peledriou

League standings

Results

See also
 Cypriot Third Division
 1997–98 Cypriot First Division
 1997–98 Cypriot Cup

Sources

Cypriot Third Division seasons
Cyprus
1997–98 in Cypriot football